The Dreadnoughts are a Canadian 6-piece folk-punk band from Vancouver. The band combines a wide range of European folk music with modern street punk.  The band has six full-length albums and three EPs on various labels, and has played around 500 shows in around 30 countries. They also perform frequently as a traditional polka band at polka festivals, under the name "Polka Time!". Their performance peak was in 2010, when 180 shows were played.

History
The Dreadnoughts formed in 2006 in the Downtown Eastside area of Vancouver, British Columbia, Canada. They released their first album, Legends Never Die, in 2007, followed by their second album, Victory Square, in 2009. They wrote Victory Square as a tribute to their home city of Vancouver, and as such, many of the songs on the album focus on places of importance to the bandmembers. The Dreadnoughts promoted the album by touring all over Canada and Europe in 2009, a tour which inspired much of the material on their 2010 album Polka's Not Dead. The tour was documented in a book by Adam PW Smith, who would later produce a mini-documentary about the band as well.

In late 2011, after producing Polka's Not Dead, the band announced an indefinite hiatus. However, they followed this by playing shows occasionally, such as annual Vancouver shows, a two-week European tour in January 2014, and two March gigs with Guttermouth in 2014. On November 11, 2017 they released their fourth full-length album Foreign Skies, a folk-punk concept album about the First World War. They followed this up with the acoustic album Into The North on November 15, 2019. Their most recent album, "Roll and Go", released on June 11, 2022.

Sound and influences
Noticeable influences in their sound include acts such as The Pogues, Dropkick Murphys, Stan Rogers, Gogol Bordello, Goran Bregovic, and Rancid. The band commonly record and perform sea shanties, polkas and klezmer songs, and are also strongly influenced by English West Country folk music - in particular the Bristol folk band The Wurzels.

Their 2009 release, Victory Square, was ranked the 4th-best folk-punk release of 2009 by folk-punk magazine Shite N' Onions. Their previous release, Legends Never Die, was ranked #7 on the magazine's 2008 list. Multiple cross-Canada tours and European tours have helped to contribute to the band's steadily rising profile.

Other acts that have shared the stage with The Dreadnoughts include Stiff Little Fingers, The Cider Fecks, Swingin' Utters, Hepcat, The Real McKenzies, Goran Bregovic, IAMX, Okean Elzy, Talco, The Creepshow, Mad Sin, and Los Furios.

Current members 
 The Fang, Guitar and Vocals 
 Wormley Wangersnitch, Violin
 Leroy "Slow Ride" McBride, Accordion and Vocals
 Drew Sexsmith, Mandolin, Banjo and Vocals (sometimes known as the Dread Pirate Druzil)
 Squid Vicious, Bass
 The Stupid Swedish Bastard, Drums

Former members 
 Fire Marshall Willie, Bass; also, past member of The Brass Action
 The Wicked Wench of the West, Bass
 Shamus, best fiddle in the west

Discography

Studio albums 
 Legends Never Die – July 2007 (Golden Tee Records)
 Victory Square -  June 2009 (Stomp Records)
 Polka's Not Dead - October 2010 (Stomp Records)
 Foreign Skies  - November 2017 (Self Released)
 Into The North - November 2019 (Stomp Records)
 Roll And Go - June 2022 (Stomp Records)
 Green Willow - March 2023 (Digital-Only, Self Released)

EPs 
 Cyder Punks Unite - July 2010, (Leech Redda)
 Uncle Touchy Goes To College - July 2011 (Bellydrop Records)
Foreign Skies (B Sides) - January 2018 (Self Released)

See also
List of bands from Canada

References

External links 
 Stomp Records Page
 Facebook Page
 Myspace Page
 Bandcamp Page
 
2011 Mini-Documentary Film
 Polka Never Dies Video shot in Poland during the 2011 European Tour

Folk punk groups
Musical groups from Vancouver
Canadian folk music groups
Musical groups established in 2007
2007 establishments in British Columbia